The list of Airfields of the United States Army Air Forces Second Air Force is as follows:

Heavy Bombardment Training Stations
 Ainsworth Army Air Field
 Alamogordo Army Air Field
 Alexandria Army Air Field
 Brownwood Army Air Field
 Bruning Army Air Field
 Casper Army Air Field
 Clovis Army Air Field
 Cut Bank Army Air Field
 Dalhart Army Air Field
 Davis-Monthan Field
 Dyersburg Army Air Base
 Ephrata Army Air Field
 Fairmont Army Air Field
 Fort Worth Army Air Field
 Glasgow Army Air Field
 Grand Island Army Air Field
 Great Bend Army Air Field
 Great Falls Army Air Base
 Greensboro Army Air Base
 Harvard Army Air Field
 Herington Army Air Field
 Kearney Army Air Field
 Kirtland Field
 Lewistown Army Air Field
 Liberal Army Air Field
 MacDill Field
 McCook Army Air Field
 Mitchell Army Air Field
 Moses Lake Army Air Base
 Mountain Home Army Air Field
 Peterson Field
 Pierre Regional Airport
 Pocatello Regional Airport
 Pratt Army Air Field
 Pueblo Memorial Airport
 Pyote Army Air Field
 Rapid City Army Air Base
 Will Rogers Field
 Scottsbluff Army Air Field
 Scribner Army Air Field
 Sioux City Army Air Base
 Spokane International Airport
 Walker Army Air Field
 Walla Walla Army Air Field
 Watertown Army Air Field
 Wendover Field

Group Training Stations
 Ainsworth Regional Airport
 Bruning Army Air Field
 Moses Lake Army Air Base
 Scribner State Airport
 Strother Army Airfield
 Walla Walla Army Airfield

Replacement Training Stations
 Ainsworth Regional Airport
 Bruning Army Air Field
 Dyersburg Army Air Base
 Kearney Army Air Field
 Liberal Army Air Field
 Sioux City Army Air Base
 Walla Walla Army Airfield

Sources
 R. Frank Futrell, “The Development of Base Facilities,” in The Army Air Forces in World War II, vol. 6, Men and Planes, ed. Wesley Frank Craven and James Lea Cate, 142 (Washington, D.C., Office of Air Force History, new imprint, 1983).

Airfields of the United States Army Air Forces in the United States
Lists of United States military installations
United States Army Air Forces lists
Lists of airports in the United States